Antiguraleus stellatomoides is a species of sea snail, a marine gastropod mollusk in the family Mangeliidae.

Description

Distribution
This marine species occurs of Taiwan

References

 Shuto, T. "New turrid taxa from the Australian waters." Mem. Fac. Sci. Kyushu Univ. Serie D Geol 25 (1983): 16.

External links
  Tucker, J.K. 2004 Catalog of recent and fossil turrids (Mollusca: Gastropoda). Zootaxa 682:1-1295.

stellatomoides
Gastropods described in 1983